Vira Kerala, also spelled Veera Kerala or Keralan, was a name given to male members of several medieval ruling families of Tamil Nadu and Kerala.

Several royals with the name "Vira Kerala" are known to scholars.

The following is a list of royals with the name "Vira Kerala" (till c. 12th century)

 Vira Kerala Amara Bhujanga Deva, a royal from Kongu Chera dynasty.
 Probably identical with Amara Bhujanga Deva, one of the princes defeated by Chola king Rajaraja (Tiruvalangadu Grant). Probably a Pandya or a Kongu Chera prince.
 Vira Kerala, from a Nagari coin legend in British Museum (11th-12th centuries AD).
Vira Kerala, a royal found in several inscriptions of Kongu Chera dynasty (western Tamil Nadu).
 Vira Kerala, fl. 11th century, one of the so-called "thennavar muvar". Defeated by Chola king Rajadhiraja (trampled by his war elephant called Attivarana).
 Probably a Kongu Chera or a Pandya prince (son of a Pandya and a Chera princess).
 This royal was previously considered as a successor of Bhaskara Ravi (i. e., a Chera Perumal king of Kerala) (K. A. N. Sastri and E. P. N. K. Pillai).
Minavan Vira Kerala, a Pandya prince, probably identical with the Kerala defeated by Rajadhiraja.
Vira Kerala, the first post-Chera Perumal king of Venad (south Kerala), 12th century AD, appears in a Cholapuram (Nagercoil) inscription (1126 AD).
Vira Kerala, a son of the last Chera Perumal Rama Kulasekhara and a Venad princess (as per Kerala tradition) - probably identical with (6).
Vira Kerala Chakravarti, the ancestor of Vira Raghava Chakravarti, the 13th century Perumapadappu king of Cranganore (Viraraghava copper plates).

References 

Indian masculine given names
Rulers of Quilon
Chera kings